Peziza granulosa is a species of apothecial fungus belonging to the family Pezizaceae. This is a European species, appearing as small pale-coloured cups up to 3 cm in diameter in various upland habitats from late spring to early autumn.

References

Peziza granulosa at Species Fungorum

Pezizaceae
Fungi described in 1803